A500 may refer to:

 A500 road, England
 A500 steel, an ASTM International grade steel for structural steel applications
 Adam A500, a utility aircraft
 Amiga 500, a home computer by Commodore
 Amiga 500 Plus or 500+, a home computer by Commodore
 Acorn A500, an early prototype of the Acorn Archimedes computer
 DSLR-A500 aka α500, a digital SLR with A-mount in the Sony Alpha camera system
 Acer Iconia Tab A500, a tablet computer by Acer